Pho Chai is a district (amphoe) in the northern part of Roi Et province, Thailand.

Geography
Neighboring districts are (from the east clockwise): Phon Thong, Selaphum, Chiang Khwan of Roi Et Province; Rong Kham, Don Chan, and Kuchinarai of Kalasin province.

History
The minor district (king amphoe) was created on 1 April 1974, when the four tambons, Chiang Mai, Kham Pia, Sa-at, and Kham Pha-ung, were split off from Phon Thong district. It was upgraded to a full district on 25 March 1979.

Administration
The district is divided into nine sub-districts (tambons), which are further subdivided into 112 villages (mubans). There are two townships (thesaban tambons). Chai Wari covers parts of tambon Kham Pia, and Chiang Mai covers tambon Chiang Mai. There are a further eight tambon administrative organizations (TAO).

References

External links
amphoe.com

Pho Chai